Laki Marwat Junction railway station is  located in  Pakistan.

See also
 List of railway stations in Pakistan
 Pakistan Railways

References

External links
The Rise and Fall of a Railway Junction

Railway stations in Lakki Marwat District
Railway stations on Bannu–Tank Branch Line
Railway stations on Daud Khel–Lakki Marwat Branch Line